In June 2013, England played a two-test series against Argentina as part of the 2013 mid-year rugby test series. This series was part of the second year of the global rugby calendar established by the International Rugby Board, which runs through to 2019.

England played the Pumas over a two-week period, playing in Estadio Padre Ernesto Martearena in Salta (8 June) and playing at Estadio José Amalfitani in the capital city of Buenos Aires (15 June). The first test was their first encounter since England's 13–9 victory over Argentina during the 2011 Rugby World Cup, and was the first time they have met in Argentina since 2009, the last time Argentina beat England. England won both matches of the series, completing their first series victory in Argentina since the 1981 England rugby union tour of Argentina, and winning both matches of a series in Argentina for the first time.

Ahead of the test series, England played their annual uncapped fixture against the Barbarians at Twickenham, and a fixture against the South American XV side, which was made up of representatives from Argentina, Brazil, Chile and Uruguay.

Fixtures

Squads

England
England's 32-man squad for fixtures against the Barbarians and the two-test tour to Argentina plus a mid-week match against South American XV.
Full-back Alex Goode and uncapped centre Joel Tomkins withdrew from the squad due to injury. They were replaced by uncapped players Stephen Myler and Luther Burrell.

Ed Slater and Calum Clark was ruled out of the tour due to injury and Kearnan Myall was added to the squad for the tour.

Haydn Thomas featured in the squad to face the Barbarians.

Alex Corbisiero left the squad ahead of the first test as he was called up for the British and Irish Lions. Corbisiero was not replaced.
 Head coach:  Stuart Lancaster
 Caps and ages are to Barbarians match (26 May 2013)

Argentina
Argentina 28-man squad for the 2013 England rugby union tour of Argentina and single test against Georgia
 Head coach:  Santiago Phelan
 Caps and ages are to Barbarians match (26 May 2013)

Matches

Warm-up match

South American XV

First test

Second test

See also
 2013 mid-year rugby test series
 History of rugby union matches between Argentina and England

References

2013
Argentina
2013 rugby union tours
2013 in Argentine rugby union